Jacksonia lehmannii is a species of leafless broom-like shrub or small tree in the family Fabaceae that is native to the south west of Western Australia. It was first described by Carl Meissner in 1844. It has no synonyms.

References 

Mirbelioids
Fabales of Australia
Rosids of Western Australia
Taxa named by Carl Meissner
Plants described in 1844
lehmanii